Economica is a peer-reviewed academic journal of generalist economics published on behalf of the London School of Economics by Wiley-Blackwell. Established in 1921, it is currently edited by Nava Ashraf, Oriana Bandiera, Tim Besley, Francesco Caselli, Maitreesh Ghatak, Stephen Machin, Ian Martin, and Gianmarco Ottaviano.

Notable papers
Two very influential papers in economics were published in Economica and have inspired a lecture series held annually at the London School of Economics:

Abstracting and indexing 
According to the Journal Citation Reports, the journal has a 2018 impact factor of 1.500, ranking it 149th out of 363 journals in the category "Economics".

See also 
 List of economics journals

References

External links 
 

Economics journals
Publications established in 1921
Wiley-Blackwell academic journals
English-language journals
Quarterly journals
1921 establishments in the United Kingdom
1921 in economics
London School of Economics